The Inter Baku 2014–15 season is Inter Baku's fourteenth Azerbaijan Premier League season, and their sixth season under manager Kakhaber Tskhadadze. They will compete in the 2014–15 UEFA Europa League, entering at the first qualifying round stage, the Azerbaijan Cup and the League.

On 5 August 2014, Inter changed the name of their stadium from Shafa Stadium to Inter Arena for sponsorship reasons.

Squad

Out on loan

Transfers

Summer

In:

Out:

Winter

In:

Out:

Friendlies

Competitions

Azerbaijan Premier League

Results summary

Results

League table

Azerbaijan Cup

UEFA Europa League

Qualifying rounds

Squad statistics

Appearances and goals

|-
|colspan="14"|Players away from Inter Baku on loan:

|-
|colspan="14"|Players who appeared for Inter Baku no longer at the club:
|}

Goal scorers

Disciplinary record

Notes 

Qarabağ have played their home games at the Tofiq Bahramov Stadium since 1993 due to the ongoing situation in Quzanlı.
Araz-Naxçıvan were excluded from the Azerbaijan Premier League on 17 November 2014, with all their results being annulled.

References

External links 
 Inter Baku at Soccerway.com

Inter
Shamakhi FK seasons